Raphael Elig (born Raphael Eligoulachvili in Paris) is a French musician and composer of Georgian origin.

Life 
After classical studies at the École Normale de Musique de Paris and harmony, counterpoint and fugue lessons with Jeannine Richer, Elig followed the film music classes of Laurent Petitgirard. He completed his training by studying electronic music at the CCRMA, (Center For Computer Research In Music & Acoustics) acoustic and musical research centre of the  Stanford University in California.

His professional career began as a composer, author and performer at EMI Group where he released two records in the early 1990s (J'me Fais du Bien and Les Garçons Aiment les Filles). In parallel he writes music for the theatre (Patrick Timsit, Clémentine Célarié, Sophia Aram, for the TV (Chic, Square Artist on Arte and Cash Investigation, Thalassa on France TV) and also composes advertising music for prestigious brands (Cartier, Vuitton, Air France, etc.).

He wrote songs for Gloria Gaynor, Yi Zhou, Sophia Aram

In the mid 90's, he joined the band Res Rocket, with English and American musicians on the Internet. The principle was to play music remotely and use the Internet as a vector of creation. The project was covered by many international medias (CNN, MTV, Canal+, etc.).

In 2003 he explored video and new technologies for a while to experiment with new artistic forms.

In 2008, he composed the music in collaboration with Eric Wenger for Marc Caro's (Delicatessen and La Cité des enfants perdus) first solo feature, Dante 01.

And in 2013, he composed the music for Rue Mandar, an Idit Cebula's film.

In 2019, he began recording his album Préludes - Avant le Jeu. For this piano project he finds simplicity and minimalism in the composition of his melodies. He inscribes this work in the tradition of piano pieces such as Schumann's Children's Scenes, Giya Kancheli's 33 miniatures, Chick Corea's Children Songs, "I wrote these pieces to express the simplicity as beauty, as represented in the mind of a child. "

It is this personal work around childhood and transmission that allows the meeting with the director Samir Guesmi at the end of 2019. He composes and performs the music for his feature film Ibrahim produced by Why Not Productions.

The rediscovery of the use of music in John Cassavetes' A Woman Under the Influence convinces him to record the music for the film on his study piano in his apartment, as an extension of his work on the album. There is a large place for silence, considering that this is part of the composition, the music and its breathing.

In September 2020, at the Angoulême Francophone Film Festival, Ibrahim won prizes including that for best music.
"The film music that we have decided to reward takes the place it should take, it sublimates without ever caricaturing. We were very touched by this sensitive and naive piano matched to the emotions of adolescence."  Prizes awarded on stage by singer Clara Luciani on behalf of the 2020 Festival Jury. In November 2021 the film Ibrahim won the First Feature Award at COLCOA the French Film Festival in Los Angeles.

His research in the field of music for images has always allowed encounters and interactions with the world of other artists.

Selected discography 
Raphael Eligoulachvili
 2022 : Préludes - Avant le Jeu (Raphaël Eligoulachvili)
 2021 : IBRAHIM Original Soundtrack Album (Why Not Productions)
 2020 : Prélude No.7 (Raphael Elig)
 2020 : Prélude No.3 (Raphael Elig)
 2020 : Interlude Ma Nishtana (Raphael Elig)
Maintenant
 2017: That's All We Know (Irradiant Hologram)
White Bamby
 2014: You Bring the Night (Folistar)
 2011: On The Sand (Folistar) 
Haarpband
 2011: Black Diamond (Recorder) 
Raphael Elig
 2013: Rue Mandar (BO) (Delabel)
 2003: DVD by Numbers (Sony Music)
 1989: Les Garçons aiment les Filles (EMI)
 1988: J'me Fais du Bien (EMI)

Selective filmography as a composer

Cinema 
 2020: Ibrahim a film by Samir Guesmi
 2019: Danse avec tes Maux a film by Touria Benzari
 2016: TAAM by Sophie Bramly
 2013: Rue Mandar by Idit Cebula
 2011: Time Project, video installation by Gilles Bensimon
 2010: L'An prochain à Bombay, documentary by Jonas Pariente and Mathias Mangin
 2008: Dante 01 by Marc Caro

Television 
 2019: Le Grand Oral on France 2
 2018: Escape News on France 4
 2018: Téva Déco on Téva
 2017: Museum Sound and musical design of the art channel
 2013: Le Bureau des affaires sexistes (miniseries) on France TV
 2012: Cash Investigation on France 2

Theatre 
 2019: A Nos Amours, music for Sophia Aram's One Woman Show, staged by Benoît Cambillard 
 2015: Le Fond de l'Air Effraie, music for Sophia Aram' One Woman Show staged by Benoît Cambillard - Festival d'Avignon
 2014: La Rose Jaune by Isabelle Bournat, music for Jacques Connort's play - Festival d'Avignon
 2012: Crise de Foi, music for Sophia Aram's One Woman Show, staged by Benoît Cambillard - Festival d'Avignon

Awards 
 2020: Best Music Award (Valois de la Musique) at the Angoulême Film Festival 2020 for Ibrahim by Samir Guesmi''

References

External links 
 
 RAPHAEL ELIG "J'me fais du bien" (YouTube)

1970 births
Living people
Musicians from Paris
École Normale de Musique de Paris alumni
French film score composers
French male musicians
French male film score composers